Odorrana chloronota , commonly known as the chloronate huia frog or copper-cheeked frog, is a species of frog in the family Ranidae that is found in Cambodia, China, India, Laos, Myanmar, Thailand, Vietnam, and possibly Bangladesh and Nepal.

Its natural habitats are subtropical or tropical moist lowland forests, subtropical or tropical moist montane forests, and rivers. It is not considered threatened by the IUCN. Another variety of frog which has recently been discovered at Arunachal Pradesh in India and closely resembles the O chloronota is named as Odorrana arunachalensis due to the black stripes on its eyes.

References
Lau, M.W.N., Baorong, G., Huiqing, G., Haitao, S., Zhigang, Y., van Dijk, P.P., Truong, N.Q., Bain. R., Dutta, S., Sengupta, S. & Bordoloi, S. 2004.  Odorrana chloronota.   2006 IUCN Red List of Threatened Species. Downloaded on 23 July 2007.

chloronota
Amphibians described in 1875
Taxa named by Albert Günther
Amphibians of Myanmar
Amphibians of Cambodia
Amphibians of China
Fauna of Hong Kong
Frogs of India
Amphibians of Laos
Amphibians of Thailand
Amphibians of Vietnam
Taxonomy articles created by Polbot